The Executive Council of the Province of Canada had a similar function to the Cabinet in England but was not responsible to the Legislative Assembly of the Province of Canada from its inception in 1841 to 1848. 

Members were advisers to the Governor and later to the Premier of the Province of Canada. Members of the Executive Council were not necessarily members of the Legislative Assembly but were usually members of the Legislative Council of the Province of Canada. Members were appointed, often for life and came from Canada East and Canada West. The council replaced the Executive Councils of Upper and Lower Canada. It sat from 1841 to 1867, when it was replaced by the Queen's Privy Council of Canada.

The Executive Council sat at several capitals of the Province of Canada:

 Kingston 1841–1843
 Montreal 1843–1849
 Toronto 1849–1852
 Quebec City 1852–1856
 Toronto 1856–1858
 Quebec City 1859–1866
 Ottawa 1866–1867

Presidents of the Executive Council

 William Morris 1846–1848
 James Leslie 1848
 Philip Michael Matthew Scott VanKoughnet 1856
 Isidore Thibaudeau, May 16, 1863 – March 29, 1864
 George Brown June 30, 1864 – December 1865
 Adam Johnston Fergusson Blair 1866

Clerks

 Samuel Boies Smith - son of Samuel Smith, British Army officer and former member of the Executive Council of Upper Canada (1817-1818, 1820) and Administrator of Upper Canada 1817-1818

References 

 

Province of Canada
Privy councils
Canadian ministers
Monarchy in Canada